Herbert House is a historic plantation home located at Hampton, Virginia. It was built in 1753 on the point of land where the Hampton River meets Sunset Creek near Hampton Roads, and is a two-story, "U"-shaped, brick and frame Georgian style dwelling.  It has a two-level front porch with the second story enclosed.

It was listed on the National Register of Historic Places in 1972. By the late 20th century the farmland surrounding the house had been developed as a marina and townhomes and the long vacant house was in danger of collapse.  Extensive renovations were made in the first decade of the 21st century to restore the historic house to its 18th-century appearance.

References

Houses on the National Register of Historic Places in Virginia
Georgian architecture in Virginia
Houses completed in 1753
Houses in Hampton, Virginia
National Register of Historic Places in Hampton, Virginia